Jason Minett (born 12 August 1971) is a former professional football defender who began his career with Norwich City.

His Carrow Road career was limited by injuries, although he went on to play for Exeter city and Lincoln City in the Football League. In 1998, he dropped into non-league football joining Doncaster Rovers and then Boston United. His career at Boston stalled when he suffered a broken leg in the 3–0 FA Trophy victory over Tamworth on 13 January 2001. Regaining fitness, he joined King's Lynn ahead of the 2001–02 season. In January 2002, he joined Stocksbridge Park Steels on loan. In April 2002, he moved on to Grantham Town, agreeing a contract for the following two seasons. In the summer of 2004, Minett joined up with his former Grantham manager John Wilkinson at Lincoln United. Wilkinson moved back to manage Grantham in June 2007 and Minett soon followed him to the Gingerbreads. Minett retired from football in June 2008 following Grantham's unsuccessful bid for promotion.

References

External links

Career info at ex-canaries.co.uk
Lincoln City F.C. Official Archive Profile
Doncaster Rovers F.C. Profile
Grantham Town F.C. Profile

Living people
1971 births
Association football defenders
English footballers
Premier League players
Norwich City F.C. players
Exeter City F.C. players
Lincoln City F.C. players
Doncaster Rovers F.C. players
Boston United F.C. players
King's Lynn F.C. players
Stocksbridge Park Steels F.C. players
Grantham Town F.C. players
Lincoln United F.C. players